Hay Flat, also spelled Hayflat, is a ghost town in Winkler and Loving counties, Texas, United States.

History
The village was founded in 1900 and, in 1910, a school was built there. Due to a drought in Winkler County between 1916 and 1920, most of the residents moved away from Hay Flat, which was abandoned a few decades later.

Geography
Hay Flat lies at the borders between Winkler and Loving counties, few miles south of the borders of New Mexico. The largest portion of the village is in Winkler County.

See also
List of ghost towns in Texas

References

Populated places in Winkler County, Texas
Populated places in Loving County, Texas
Ghost towns in West Texas